The 1959 Tipperary Senior Hurling Championship was the 69th staging of the Tipperary Senior Hurling Championship since its establishment by the Tipperary County Board in 1887.

Thurles Sarsfields were the defending champions.

On 23 August 1959, Thurles Sarsfields won the championship after a 3-12 to 2-06 defeat of Kilruane MacDonaghs in the final at Thurles Sportsfield. It was their 22nd championship title overall and their fifth title in succession.

Results

Final

Championship statistics

Miscellaneous

 Thurles Sarsfields become the first club to win five titles in a row.

References

Tipperary
Tipperary Senior Hurling Championship